Stizus is a genus of sand wasps belonging to the family Crabronidae. There are over 100 species.

They are yellow and black, rarely reddish. Species within this genus can be found in Europe, in Africa, and in North America.

European species
Species within this genus include:
Stizus aestivalis Mercet, 1906
Stizus annulatus (Klug, 1845)
Stizus bipunctatus (Smith, 1856)
Stizus continuus (Klug, 1835)
Stizus fasciatus (Fabricius, 1781)
Stizus hispanicus Mocsary, 1883
Stizus perrisi DuFour, 1838
Stizus pubescens (Klug, 1835)
Stizus ruficornis (Forster, 1771)
Stizus rufipes (Fabricius, 1804)
Stizus tricolor Handlirsch, 1892

See also
 List of Stizus species

References 

Manfred Blösch: Die Grabwespen Deutschlands: Lebensweise, Verhalten, Verbreitung. 1. Auflage. Goecke & Evers, 2000, .

Crabronidae
Apoidea genera